The Shiromani Akali Dal (SAD) is a political party in India.

Shiromani Akali Dal may also refer to:

Political parties in Punjab
Shiromani Akali Dal 
Shiromani Akali Dal (Amritsar), a splinter group of the Shiromani Akali Dal, formed in 1994
Shiromani Akali Dal (Sanyukt) formed in 2021.

Parties outside Punjab
Shiromani Akali Dal Delhi, a splinter group which was formed in 1999 in Delhi
Haryana State Akali Dal, a splinter group which was formed in May 1999 in Haryana

Former parties
Akali Dal – Sant Fateh Singh Group
Akali Dal – Master Tara Singh Group
Shiromani Akali Dal (Longowal), merged with Congress in 2014.
Sarb Hind Shiromani Akali Dal, reunited with the SAD in 2003
Shiromani Akali Dal (Panthik), merged with Congress in 1997
United Akali Dal, merged with SAD (D) in July 2020
Shiromani Akali Dal (Taksali), merged with SAD(D) in 2021
Shiromani Akali Dal (Democratic), formed in 1996 reunited with SAD in 2004, re-established in 2020, merged with SAD(T)